WGBI may refer to:
An A.M. radio station on 910 kHz at Scranton, Pennsylvania, United States, which held the callsign WGBI from 1925 until 2005.
An F.M. radio station on 101.3 MHz at Scranton, Pennsylvania, United States, which held the callsign WGBI-FM from 1948 until 1993.
A low-power television station on Channel 21 at Farmington, Maine, United States, which used the callsign WGBI-LP from 2006 until 2021.
A television station on Channel 22 at Scranton, Pennsylvania, United States, which formerly held the callsign WGBI-TV from 1953 until 1958.
FTSE World Government Bond Index